Wallace Peak is a  summit in British Columbia, Canada.

Description
Wallace Peak is located in The Bugaboos, at the head of Vowell Creek in Bugaboo Provincial Park. Precipitation runoff from Wallace Peak's east slope drains into the headwaters of Vowell Creek → Bobbie Burns Creek → Spillimacheen River → Columbia River; and from the west slope to Duncan River via East Creek. The nearest higher neighbor is Mount Kelvin,  to the north.

History
The first ascent of the summit was made on August 10, 1952, by Peter Robinson, Bob Collins, Bill Briggs, and John Briggs.

The peak was then named by the same Peter Robinson to honor James Nevin Wallace (1870–1941), a prominent Canadian surveyor, historian, and geologist. The toponym was officially adopted on June 9, 1960, by the Geographical Names Board of Canada.

Climate

Based on the Köppen climate classification, Wallace Peak is located in a subarctic climate zone with cold, snowy winters, and mild summers. Winter temperatures can drop below −20 °C with wind chill factors below −30 °C. This climate supports the Vowell Glacier south of the peak and an unnamed glacier on the peak's west slope.

See also
 The Bugaboos
 Geography of British Columbia

References

External links
 Wallace Peak: weather
 James Nevin Wallace (biography and photo): Albertalandsurveyhistory.ca

Columbia Valley
Two-thousanders of British Columbia
Purcell Mountains
Kootenay Land District